Back to the Sagas is the third studio album by London rapper Klashnekoff, released July 26, 2010, on Abstract Urban. Production for the album took place during 2009 to 2010 at several recording studios and was handled by Smasher, DJ Insite, Joe Buddha and Sleeping Giants.

Track listing 

 (co) - co-producer
 (add) - additional producer

2010 albums
Klashnekoff albums